Berserker Raids is a turn-based strategy video game designed by LLoyd Johnson and Fred Saberhagen for the Apple II and  published by Baen Software in 1983. It was ported to the
Atari 8-bit family, Commodore 64, and DOS.

Gameplay
Berserker Raids is a game in which automated machines operate as murderous space fortresses, based on short stories written by Fred Saberhagen in the 1960s.

Reception
Jasper Sylvester reviewed the game for Computer Gaming World, and stated that "I wouldn't hesitate to recommend Berserker Raids to any Saberhagen or space conquest fan."

References

External links
Review in Computer Shopper
Review in Commodore Microcomputers
Review in Commodore Power/Play
Review in Chicago Tribune

1983 video games
Apple II games
Atari 8-bit family games
Commodore 64 games
Computer wargames
DOS games
Science fiction video games
Turn-based strategy video games
Video games developed in the United States
Video games set in outer space